Yergeni is a hilly area in Russia. It is located in the southern corner of the East European Plain, mostly in Kalmykia, with parts in Volgograd Oblast and Rostov Oblast.

In Kalmykia the hills stretch from Sarpinsky District to the north to Iki-Burulsky District in the south.

History
A thorough topographic survey of the Yergeni was carried out in 1860-61 by Russian topographer Ivan Krizhin, who drew the first maps of the area.

The Volga-Don Canal was built across the northern part of the hill area in 1952.

Geography
The Yergeni area forms the watershed between the Azov and the Caspian seas. The hills lie to the west of the lower course of the Volga, between Volgograd to the north and the Manych Depression to the south. The western slope, on the other hand, gradually descends to the Don valley.

The Sal, a left tributary of the Don, us the main river having its sources in the hills.

Flora and fauna
The climate is semi-desert and the hills are mostly covered with grasses and shrubs, including feather grass, Volga fescue, wormwood and saltwort, but some trees, such as willow, oak, elm, and aspen, may grow in the ravines of the eastern slopes.

Some of the animals found in the hills are the demoiselle crane, the eastern imperial eagle, steppe eagle, red-footed falcon, white-winged lark and the javelin sand boa.

See also
Highest points of Russian Federal subjects
List of mountains and hills of Russia
Kalmyk Steppe

References

External links
 
Geological and geomorphological structure of the eastern foot of the Yergeni Hills (Preliminary results)
Landforms of Kalmykia
Hills of Russia